Elections to the Nevada Assembly was held on November 3, 2020. Elections were also held in the state for U.S. president, U.S. House of Representatives, and for the Nevada Senate.

Primary elections were held on August 8.

Predictions

Results

Overview

Close races
Seats where the margin of victory was under 10%:

District 1

District 2

District 3

District 4

District 5

District 6

District 7

District 8

District 9

District 10

District 11

District 12

District 13

District 14

District 15

District 16

District 17

District 18

District 19

District 20

District 21

District 22

District 23

District 24

District 25

District 26

District 27

District 28

District 29

District 30

District 31

District 32

District 33

District 34

District 35

District 36

District 37

District 38

District 39

District 40

District 41

District 42

See also
 2020 Nevada elections

References

External links
 
 
  (State affiliate of the U.S. League of Women Voters)
 

Assembly
Nevada State Assembly elections
Nevada House